The 1975–76 Western Kentucky Hilltoppers men's basketball team represented Western Kentucky University during the 1975–76 NCAA Division I men's basketball season. The Hilltoppers were led by Ohio Valley Conference Coach of the Year Jim Richards and OVC Player of the Year Johnny Britt.  WKU won the OVC regular season and tournament championships, as well as the conference's automatic bid to the 1976 NCAA Division I Basketball Tournament.  Wilson James joined Britt on the All-OVC Team; they were also selected to the OVC Tournament team and Britt was tournament MVP.

Schedule

|-
!colspan=6| Regular season

|-

 
|-
!colspan=6| 1976 Ohio Valley Conference Men's Basketball Tournament

|-
!colspan=6| 1976 NCAA Division I Basketball Tournament

References

Western Kentucky Hilltoppers basketball seasons
Western Kentucky
Western Kentucky
Western Kentucky Basketball, Men's
Western Kentucky Basketball, Men's